Edier Tello (born 2 March 1990) is a Colombian professional football forward. Tello is a product of the Millonarios F.C. youth system and played with the Millonarios F.C. first team since January, 2009.

Statistics (Official games/Colombian Ligue and Colombian Cup)
(As of November 14, 2010)

References

External links
 Edier Tello at Soccerway 

1990 births
Living people
Colombian footballers
Millonarios F.C. players
Association football forwards
Sportspeople from Chocó Department